Absolute magnitude is a measure of the luminosity of a celestial object on an inverse logarithmic astronomical magnitude scale. An object's absolute magnitude is defined to be equal to the apparent magnitude that the object would have if it were viewed from a distance of exactly , without extinction (or dimming) of its light due to absorption by interstellar matter and cosmic dust. By hypothetically placing all objects at a standard reference distance from the observer, their luminosities can be directly compared among each other on a magnitude scale.

As with all astronomical magnitudes, the absolute magnitude can be specified for different wavelength ranges corresponding to specified filter bands or passbands; for stars a commonly quoted absolute magnitude is the absolute visual magnitude, which uses the visual (V) band of the spectrum (in the UBV photometric system). Absolute magnitudes are denoted by a capital M, with a subscript representing the filter band used for measurement, such as MV for absolute magnitude in the V band.

The more luminous an object, the smaller the numerical value of its absolute magnitude. A difference of 5 magnitudes between the absolute magnitudes of two objects corresponds to a ratio of 100 in their luminosities, and a difference of n magnitudes in absolute magnitude corresponds to a luminosity ratio of 100n/5. For example, a star of absolute magnitude MV = 3.0 would be 100 times as luminous as a star of absolute magnitude MV = 8.0 as measured in the V filter band. The Sun has absolute magnitude MV = +4.83. Highly luminous objects can have negative absolute magnitudes: for example, the Milky Way galaxy has an absolute B magnitude of about −20.8.

An object's absolute bolometric magnitude (Mbol) represents its total luminosity over all wavelengths, rather than in a single filter band, as expressed on a logarithmic magnitude scale. To convert from an absolute magnitude in a specific filter band to absolute bolometric magnitude, a bolometric correction (BC) is applied.

For Solar System bodies that shine in reflected light, a different definition of absolute magnitude (H) is used, based on a standard reference distance of one astronomical unit.

Stars and galaxies
In stellar and galactic astronomy, the standard distance is 10 parsecs (about 32.616 light-years, 308.57 petameters or 308.57 trillion kilometres). A star at 10 parsecs has a parallax of 0.1″ (100 milliarcseconds). Galaxies (and other extended objects) are much larger than 10 parsecs, their light is radiated over an extended patch of sky, and their overall brightness cannot be directly observed from relatively short distances, but the same convention is used. A galaxy's magnitude is defined by measuring all the light radiated over the entire object, treating that integrated brightness as the brightness of a single point-like or star-like source, and computing the magnitude of that point-like source as it would appear if observed at the standard 10 parsecs distance. Consequently, the absolute magnitude of any object equals the apparent magnitude it would have if it were 10 parsecs away.

Some stars visible to the naked eye have such a low absolute magnitude that they would appear bright enough to outshine the planets and cast shadows if they were at 10 parsecs from the Earth. Examples include Rigel (−7.0), Deneb (−7.2), Naos (−6.0), and Betelgeuse (−5.6). For comparison, Sirius has an absolute magnitude of only 1.4, which is still brighter than the Sun, whose absolute visual magnitude is 4.83. The Sun's absolute bolometric magnitude is set arbitrarily, usually at 4.75.
Absolute magnitudes of stars generally range from approximately −10 to +20. The absolute magnitudes of galaxies can be much lower (brighter). For example, the giant elliptical galaxy M87 has an absolute magnitude of −22 (i.e. as bright as about 60,000 stars of magnitude −10). Some active galactic nuclei (quasars like CTA-102) can reach absolute magnitudes in excess of −32, making them the most luminous persistent objects in the observable universe, although these objects can vary in brightness over astronomically short timescales. At the extreme end, the optical afterglow of the gamma ray burst GRB 080319B reached, according to one paper, an absolute r magnitude brighter than −38 for a few tens of seconds.

Apparent magnitude 

The Greek astronomer Hipparchus established a numerical scale to describe the brightness of each star appearing in the sky. The brightest stars in the sky were assigned an apparent magnitude , and the dimmest stars visible to the naked eye are assigned . The difference between them corresponds to a factor of 100 in brightness. For objects within the immediate neighborhood of the Sun, the absolute magnitude  and apparent magnitude  from any distance  (in parsecs, with 1 pc = 3.2616 light-years) are related by

where  is the radiant flux measured at distance  (in parsecs),  the radiant flux measured at distance . Using the common logarithm, the equation can be written as

where it is assumed that extinction from gas and dust is negligible. Typical extinction rates within the Milky Way galaxy are 1 to 2 magnitudes per kiloparsec, when dark clouds are taken into account.

Instead, general relativity must be taken into account. Moreover, the cosmological redshift complicates the relationship between absolute and apparent magnitude, because the radiation observed was shifted into the red range of the spectrum. To compare the magnitudes of very distant objects with those of local objects, a K correction might have to be applied to the magnitudes of the distant objects.

The absolute magnitude  can also be written in terms of the apparent magnitude  and stellar parallax :

or using apparent magnitude  and distance modulus :

Examples 
Rigel has a visual magnitude  of 0.12 and distance of about 860 light-years:

Vega has a parallax  of 0.129″, and an apparent magnitude  of 0.03:

The Black Eye Galaxy has a visual magnitude  of 9.36 and a distance modulus  of 31.06:

Bolometric magnitude 

The bolometric absolute magnitude , takes into account electromagnetic radiation at all wavelengths. It includes those unobserved due to instrumental passband, the Earth's atmospheric absorption, and extinction by interstellar dust. It is defined based on the luminosity of the stars. In the case of stars with few observations, it must be computed assuming an effective temperature.

Classically, the difference in bolometric magnitude is related to the luminosity ratio according to:

which makes by inversion:

where
 is the Sun's luminosity (bolometric luminosity)
 is the star's luminosity (bolometric luminosity)
 is the bolometric magnitude of the Sun
 is the bolometric magnitude of the star.

In August 2015, the International Astronomical Union passed Resolution B2 defining the zero points of the absolute and apparent bolometric magnitude scales in SI units for power (watts) and irradiance (W/m2), respectively. Although bolometric magnitudes had been used by astronomers for many decades, there had been systematic differences in the absolute magnitude-luminosity scales presented in various astronomical references, and no international standardization. This led to systematic differences in bolometric corrections scales. Combined with incorrect assumed absolute bolometric magnitudes for the Sun, this could lead to systematic errors in estimated stellar luminosities (and other stellar properties, such as radii or ages, which rely on stellar luminosity to be calculated).

Resolution B2 defines an absolute bolometric magnitude scale where  corresponds to luminosity , with the zero point luminosity  set such that the Sun (with nominal luminosity ) corresponds to absolute bolometric magnitude . Placing a radiation source (e.g. star) at the standard distance of 10 parsecs, it follows that the zero point of the apparent bolometric magnitude scale  corresponds to irradiance .

Following Resolution B2, the relation between a star's absolute bolometric magnitude and its luminosity is no longer directly tied to the Sun's (variable) luminosity:

where
 is the star's luminosity (bolometric luminosity) in watts
 is the zero point luminosity 
 is the bolometric magnitude of the star

The new IAU absolute magnitude scale permanently disconnects the scale from the variable Sun.

The luminosity of the star in watts can be calculated as a function of its absolute bolometric magnitude  as:

using the variables as defined previously.

Solar System bodies 

For planets and asteroids, a definition of absolute magnitude that is more meaningful for non-stellar objects is used. The absolute magnitude, commonly called , is defined as the apparent magnitude that the object would have if it were one astronomical unit (AU) from both the Sun and the observer, and in conditions of ideal solar opposition (an arrangement that is impossible in practice). Because Solar System bodies are illuminated by the Sun, their brightness varies as a function of illumination conditions, described by the phase angle. This relationship is referred to as the phase curve. The absolute magnitude is the brightness at phase angle zero, an arrangement known as opposition, from a distance of one AU.

Apparent magnitude 

The absolute magnitude  can be used to calculate the apparent magnitude  of a body.

where  is the phase angle, the angle between the body-Sun and body–observer lines.  is the phase integral (the integration of reflected light; a number in the 0 to 1 range).

By the law of cosines, we have:

Distances:
  is the distance between the body and the observer
  is the distance between the body and the Sun
  is the distance between the observer and the Sun
 , a unit conversion factor, is the constant 1 AU, the average distance between the Earth and the Sun

Approximations for phase integral  
The value of  depends on the properties of the reflecting surface, in particular on its roughness. In practice, different approximations are used based on the known or assumed properties of the surface. The surfaces of terrestrial planets are generally more difficult to model than those of gaseous planets, the latter of which have smoother visible surfaces.

Planets as diffuse spheres 

Planetary bodies can be approximated reasonably well as ideal diffuse reflecting spheres. Let  be the phase angle in degrees, then

A full-phase diffuse sphere reflects two-thirds as much light as a diffuse flat disk of the same diameter. A quarter phase has  as much light as full phase.

By contrast, a diffuse disk reflector model is simply , which isn't realistic, but it does represent the opposition surge for rough surfaces that reflect more uniform light back at low phase angles.

The definition of the geometric albedo , a measure for the reflectivity of planetary surfaces, is based on the diffuse disk reflector model. The absolute magnitude , diameter  (in kilometers) and geometric albedo  of a body are related by

Example: The Moon's absolute magnitude  can be calculated from its diameter  and geometric albedo :

We have , 
At quarter phase,  (according to the diffuse reflector model), this yields an apparent magnitude of  The actual value is somewhat lower than that,  The phase curve of the Moon is too complicated for the diffuse reflector model. A more accurate formula is given in the following section.

More advanced models 

Because Solar System bodies are never perfect diffuse reflectors, astronomers use different models to predict apparent magnitudes based on known or assumed properties of the body. For planets, approximations for the correction term  in the formula for  have been derived empirically, to match observations at different phase angles.

Neptune's absolute magnitude is changing slowly due to seasonal effects as the planet moves along its 165-year orbit around the Sun, and the approximation above is only valid after the year 2000. For some circumstances, like  for Venus, no observations are available, and the phase curve is unknown in those cases. The formula for the Moon is only applicable to the near side of the Moon, the portion that is visible from the Earth.

Under full-phase conditions, Venus would have been visible at  Accounting for the high phase angle, the correction term above yields an actual apparent magnitude of  This is close to the value of  predicted by the Jet Propulsion Laboratory.

At last quarter, the Moon is about 0.06 mag fainter than at first quarter, because that part of its surface has a lower albedo.

Earth's albedo varies by a factor of 6, from 0.12 in the cloud-free case to 0.76 in the case of altostratus cloud. The absolute magnitude in the table corresponds to an albedo of 0.434. Due to the variability of the weather, Earth's apparent magnitude cannot be predicted as accurately as that of most other planets.

Asteroids 

If an object has an atmosphere, it reflects light more or less isotropically in all directions, and its brightness can be modelled as a diffuse reflector. Bodies with no atmosphere, like asteroids or moons, tend to reflect light more strongly to the direction of the incident light, and their brightness increases rapidly as the phase angle approaches . This rapid brightening near opposition is called the opposition effect. Its strength depends on the physical properties of the body's surface, and hence it differs from asteroid to asteroid.

In 1985, the IAU adopted the semi-empirical -system, based on two parameters  and  called absolute magnitude and slope, to model the opposition effect for the ephemerides published by the Minor Planet Center.

where

This relation is valid for phase angles , and works best when .

The slope parameter  relates to the surge in brightness, typically , when the object is near opposition. In rare cases,  can be negative.

However, as of 2022, this -system has not been adopted by either the Minor Planet Center nor Jet Propulsion Laboratory.

In addition, their absolute magnitude can vary with the viewing direction, depending on their axial tilt. In many cases, neither the rotation period nor the axial tilt are known, limiting the predictability. The models presented here do not capture those effects.

Cometary magnitudes 
The brightness of comets is given separately as total magnitude (the brightness integrated over the entire visible extend of the coma) and nuclear magnitude (the brightness of the core region alone). Both are different scales than the magnitude scale used for planets and asteroids, and can not be used for a size comparison with an asteroid's absolute magnitude .

The activity of comets varies with their distance from the Sun. Their brightness can be approximated as

For , this reduces to the formula for a purely reflecting body (showing no cometary activity).

The total apparent magnitude  is predicted to have been  at that time. The Minor Planet Center gives a value close to that, .

The absolute magnitude of any given comet can vary dramatically. It can change as the comet becomes more or less active over time or if it undergoes an outburst. This makes it difficult to use the absolute magnitude for a size estimate. It was subsequently lost and was only rediscovered in 2003.

For some comets that have been observed at heliocentric distances large enough to distinguish between light reflected from the coma, and light from the nucleus itself, an absolute magnitude analogous to that used for asteroids has been calculated, allowing to estimate the sizes of their nuclei.

Meteors 

See also 
 Araucaria Project
 Hertzsprung–Russell diagram – relates absolute magnitude or luminosity versus spectral color or surface temperature.
 Jansky radio astronomer's preferred unit – linear in power/unit area
 List of most luminous stars
 Photographic magnitude
 Surface brightness – the magnitude for extended objects
 Zero point (photometry) – the typical calibration point for star flux

References

External links 
 Reference zero-magnitude fluxes 
 International Astronomical Union
 Absolute Magnitude of a Star calculator
 The Magnitude system
 About stellar magnitudes
 Obtain the magnitude of any star – SIMBAD
 Converting magnitude of minor planets to diameter
 Another table for converting asteroid magnitude to estimated diameter

Observational astronomy